Redd's Blues is an album by the American pianist Freddie Redd, recorded in 1961 but not released on the Blue Note label until 1988.

Releases and reception 

Redd's Blues was released on LP in 1988, and on CD in 2002. The Penguin Guide to Jazz described the album as "very dull indeed", and added that "Freddie's compositions are pastiche bebop, and if you were told these had been written to soundtrack a 'jazz play' you'd readily believe it". The AllMusic reviewer concluded that "Redd's Blues sounds like one of those off-days where the music just came out sounding generic and lifeless".

Track listing 
All compositions by Freddie Redd
 "Now" - 7:15
 "Cute Doot" - 6:17
 "Old Spice" - 7:04
 "Blues for Betsy" - 5:02
 "Somewhere" - 5:56
 "Love Lost" - 7:12
 Recorded at Rudy Van Gelder Studio, Englewood Cliffs, New Jersey, on January 17, 1961.

Personnel 
 Freddie Redd - piano
 Benny Bailey - trumpet
 Jackie McLean - alto saxophone
 Tina Brooks - tenor saxophone
 Paul Chambers - double bass
 Sir John Godfrey - drums

References 

Blue Note Records albums
Freddie Redd albums
1988 albums
Albums recorded at Van Gelder Studio